Radymno  ( Radymno,  Redem) is a town in south-eastern Poland with 5,543 inhabitants (02.06.2009). It has been part of the Podkarpackie Voivodeship since its creation in 1999. Radymno was previously in the Przemyśl Voivodeship from 1975–1998.

History

First traces of human settlement in what today is Radymno date back to the Neolithic times, as in 1958, archaeologists found remains of a 2nd-century settlement. In early Middle Ages, the area was part of Polish state, but in 981, it was seized by Kievan Rus'. The area was then regained and lost by Poland two more times. In the mid-13th century it fell under Mongol suzerainty, and afterwards it was eventually recaptured by Polish King Casimir III the Great in mid-14th century.

In 1366, a nobleman Bernard of Szynwałd received permission from Casimir III to establish a settlement in the fields. In 1384, Radymno was presented to the Bishops of Przemyśl, and in 1431 King Władysław II Jagiełło gave town charter to the village. Due to its location by the San, and along a busy merchant route, Radymno was an important trade and market center. The town, however, was looted by Wallachians (1488) and Crimean Tatars (1502, 1624). Furthermore, it burned in fires (1603, 1638, 1647). To protect it from further raids, Radymno was fortified in 1625, but in 1656 it was captured by Swedes, and in 1657 by Transilvanians during the Swedish invasion of Poland. Swedish wars left Radymno in ruins, and the town for many years did not recover from widespread destruction. In late July 1683, the army of Hetman Stanisław Jan Jabłonowski camped near Radymno, on its way towards Vienna (see Battle of Vienna).

In the second half of the 18th century, before the Partitions of Poland, the population of Radymno was 1200, with 154 houses, three churches, hospital, parish school, two brickyards, and a residence of the Bishops of Przemyśl.

In the middle of 18th century, Radymno had a population of 860 Roman Catholics, 196 people of Greek Catholic faith, and 26 Jews. As a result of the First Partition of Poland (Treaty of St-Petersburg dated 5 July 1772), Radymno was annexed by the Habsburg monarchy. It was part of the Bezirkshauptmannschaft Jaroslau (Jarosław County). It formed part of the newly formed Kingdom of Galicia and Lodomeria (Austrian Partition of Poland), within which it remained until November 1918, when Poland regained independence and control of the town.

In 1860, Radymno received rail connection with Przemyśl. Austrian government for a while considered construction of a fortress here, but changed their minds and created Przemyśl Fortress instead. In 1857–1867 Radymno was the seat of a county. In late 19th century, the town had the population of 2700.

On May 24, 1915, the Battle of Radymno took place between Russian 8th Army of General Aleksei Brusilov, and German-Austrian 8th Army under General August von Mackensen. The town was almost completely destroyed.

In the Second Polish Republic, Radymno belonged to the Lwów Voivodeship, with a mixed Polish - Jewish population of 2,500.

World War II
On September 10, 1939, during the Invasion of Poland, which started World War II, German 4th Light Division crossed the San here, after a very light resistance and barely any battle with Polish Army's Jarosław Group under Colonel Jan Wójcik, who just escaped to the East as quickly as he could leaving Poland to defend itself. According to the memoir of Dov Hister, during the German invasion of Radymno three Polish Army Youth took out a position in the Council's tower, the Germans blown the tower with one cannon shot and killed and buried the three boys under the tower's rubble.

Radymno fell under German occupation, and the Einsatzgruppe I entered the town to commit various atrocities against the populace. Officers of the local Polish military unit were among the victims of the large Katyn massacre, which was carried out by the Russians in April–May 1940. During the war, groups of the Organization of Ukrainian Nationalists, which operated in the area, murdered 59 Poles, including 29 killed in the village of Michałówka. Of the estimated 1,200 Jews in Radymno prior to the World War II only a handful survived, many were handed over by the Ukrainian's collaborators to the Germans and their Nazi regime. Some of the Jews were murdered by the Nazis outside the village in September 1939. The story of the Jewish residents of Radymno is documented in Dov Hister book The Power of Survival.

Radymno was captured by the Red Army on July 26, 1944, after heavy fighting with German armoured units, and afterwards it was restored to Poland.

Sport
Radymno is a small town, but it is extremely developed in terms of sport. Currently in the city there are 4 sports club.

MKS Radymno

It is a football men's club. Since 1934 operated in Radymno Military&Civil Sports Society. Later, the name of this club has changed. Until now its name is MKS Radymno. The team has its own stadium, where we can find about 1000 seats. Since season 2004/05 the team plays in class constituency. At the moment, MKS Radymno plays in the Fifth Division. There are 3 sections: senior, junior and junior junior. In this club's history we can find many presidents, but Grzegorz Olech is a current one. (Official page  )

TKS “Żagiel” Radymno

It is a volleyball men's club. “Żagiel” is a relatively young club, because it has started  its activity in 2010. That's the only club in the city, in which men can play the volleyball. There are 2 sections: senior and cadet. The senior play in the Second Podkarpacie League. Cadets play in Podkarpacie League Cadets. Zdzisław Koniuch is the founder and the president of the club. (Official page  )

KS Feniks Radymno

It is a volleyball women's club. Women's passion and involvement women's in volleyball were the main factors why this club was created. That was in 2012. Feniks Radymno has 2 sections: junior and youngster. At the beginning the team play in Amateur Volleyball League. Every year the club gets one of three places on the podium. Also every year Feniks with the president of the city are organizing New Year's female Volleyball Tournament. (Official page  )
 
UKS Giganci Radymno

It is the youngest club in the city. The club was created by involved parents, in 2015. They didn't want their children to spend most of the day by playing games, but rather to be active and do some sports. Giganci Radymno is mainly football club, but it has also a chess section. In the club yoy can find children aged 7 to 13 years. (Official page  )

References

External links
Official website

Cities and towns in Podkarpackie Voivodeship
Jarosław County
14th-century establishments in Poland
Populated places established in the 1360s
Holocaust locations in Poland